This is a list of football clubs in Grenada.

Ball Dogs
Carib Hurricane FC
Chantimelle
Eagles Super Strikers
Fontenoy United
GBSS
Paradise
Queen's Park Rangers
South Stars
Willis Youths

Grenada
 
Football clubs